Plaza Mariachi Music City located at 3955 Nolensville Pike, Nashville, TN 37211 is a tourist and entertainment center that includes an art gallery, a Mariachi Hall of Fame, live music and entertainment as well as shopping. The Plaza Mariachi officially opened on May 12, 2017 after 3 years of development at a cost of $15,000,000. US Bank invested $2.3 Million in the development of the Plaza Mariachi while also making a $30,000 contribution to the Hispanic Family Foundation, a non-profit organization located at the Plaza Mariachi.

References

External links 

Tourist attractions in Nashville, Tennessee
Shopping malls in Tennessee
Music venues in Tennessee
2017 establishments in Tennessee
Shopping malls established in 2017